The Road Rights and Liabilities of Wheelmen written by George B. Clementson at the height of the bicycle's golden age, in 1895, was the first treatise on bicycle law. In the 1880s and 1890s, the prevailing legal issue cyclists (or wheelmen as they were then called) faced was the question of the right to the road. In a series of seminal right to the road cases, cyclists gained legal rights that form the basis of cyclist's legal rights today. Although bicycle law has developed substantially since 1895, The Road Rights and Liabilities of Wheelmen continues to serve as an outstanding resource for those early right to the road cases.

References
 The Road Rights and Liabilities of Wheelmen, by George B. Clementson (Chicago: Callaghan & Co., 1895)
 The Road Rights and Liabilities of Wheelmen in Google Books. 

Bicycle law
Cycling books
Legal treatises
Law of the United States